Matteo Priuli  (1577–1624) was a Roman Catholic cardinal.

References

1577 births
1624 deaths
17th-century Italian cardinals